Chaudhary Ram Kishan Bairagi is a senior leader of Indian National Congress and Janata Party from Haryana. He has served as minister in Government of Haryana, Chief Parliamentary Secretary and Chairman of Haryana Housing Board. He joined the BJP in 2014.

He contested his first election from Indian National Congress at the age of 29 in the year 1968 and lost by a minuscule margin. He successfully fought the 1977 Haryana Vidhan Sabha election representing Janata Party.

Bairagi was the member of the Haryana Legislative Assembly from the Janata Party representing the Safidon Vidhan sabha Constituency in Haryana since 1977 to 1982.

References

https://www.hryvidhansabhahistory.com/pdffiles/who/1977.pdf

External links
Haryana Vidhan Sabha 1977 Who’s Who

Indian National Congress politicians
Living people
1938 births